KEAA-LP (97.9 FM) is a high school radio station licensed to serve Eagle, Alaska, USA. It is owned by Eagle Community School and broadcasts a high school radio format.

The station was assigned the KEAA-LP call letters by the Federal Communications Commission on November 7, 2003.

References

External links
 
 KEAA-LP service area per the FCC database

2005 establishments in Alaska
Buildings and structures in Southeast Fairbanks Census Area, Alaska
High school radio stations in the United States
EAA-LP
Radio stations established in 2005